Clifden may refer to:

 Clifden, a small town on the west coast of Ireland 
 Clifden, New Zealand, a hamlet, noted for the tourist attractions of:
 Clifden Suspension Bridge
 Clifden Limestone Caves

See also
 Clifton (disambiguation)